Appledore Lifeboat Station is the base for Royal National Lifeboat Institution (RNLI) search and rescue operations at Appledore, Devon in the United Kingdom. The first lifeboat was stationed in the town in 1825 and the present station was opened in 2001. It operates a  all weather boat (AWB) and an  B Class inshore lifeboat (ILB).

History

The Bideford District Association of the Royal National Institution for the Preservation of Life from Shipwreck (as it was then known) introduced a lifeboat service in February 1825. The boat was kept in the King's Watch House at Appledore. In 1831 the work was taken over by the Devon Humane Society and they built a new boat house at Watertown, half a mile nearer the sea. This was large enough for two boats and a second one arrived in December that year, but in 1848 was transferred to a second boat house at Braunton Burrows on the opposite side of the estuary. It was easier to launch from here to help ships on that side of the water, but crews for lifeboats at Braunton Burrows always came from Appledore. A third station was built at Northam Burrows to the west of Appledore in 1851. This was expanded to house a second boat in 1856 and the old boat house at Watertown eventually lost its boats.

The two stations were remote from Appledore where the crews lived. With the development of boats that could be more easily sailed (rather than just rowed) a new boat house was built at Badstep in 1889 to replace Northam Burrows. During World War I it became difficult to find the horses and men necessary for launching boats at Braunton Burrows, so it too was closed temporarily in 1918 and this became permanent the following year. The first motor lifeboat arrived on station in 1922. Instead, a small boarding boat was kept in it and used to ferry the crew out to the lifeboat. The new lifeboat had a shallower draught than was usual for a Watson Class and also had her stern strengthened, both modifications to help crossing the shallow water at the mouth of the estuary.

An inshore lifeboat has been stationed at Appledore since 1972 and is kept in the boathouse with the boarding boat. The boat house had a new crew room installed at first-floor level in 1980, but was demolished in 2000 and a new station opened the following year.

Service awards
The volunteer crews of the RNLI do not expect reward or recognition for their work, but the records include many rescues that have been recognised by letters, certificates and medals from the RNLI management. The following are some of the most notable.

On 17 November 1962, the  Louisa Ann Hawker was launched in a northerly gale to assist the Royal Fleet Auxiliary tanker Green Ranger which had broken free from her tug and run aground on rocks near Hartland Point. While the lifeboat found the tanker they could not find any of her crew. The lifeboat stood by for some time until it became clear that the crew had already been saved by breeches buoy, so it returned through the dangerous waters at the estuary mouth to its berth by the boat house. Despite not saving anyone, the RNLI awarded Sidney Cann, the coxswain, a Silver Medal for his work in extremely difficult seas that night.

The  George Gibson put to sea on 31 March 1994 when the local fishing boat Torridge Warrior was struggling through a gale with just one of its engines working. The lifeboat reached the boat on the seaward side of the shallow water off Bideford but, due to the state of the tide and weather, had to tow her to Ilfracombe. The tow line broke but was reconnected. The Ilfracombe Lifeboat arrived and took over the tow but the Appledore boat continued to escort them. They then had to wait three hours for sufficient water to enter Ilfracombe harbour before returning home. Coxswain Michael Bowden was awarded a Bronze Medal for his seamanship that afternoon.

Description

The lifeboat station is situated in Jubilee Road. At ground level, facing a slipway, is covered accommodation for the ILB, boarding boat and their tractors.

Area of operation
Appledore is situated on the estuary of the rivers Taw and Torridge near the north Devon coast. Adjacent lifeboats are at Ilfracombe Lifeboat Station to the North, and Clovelly Lifeboat Station to the South.

Current fleet

 16-16 Mollie Hunt  AWB
 B-861 Glanely  B Class ILB
 BB-060 inflatable boarding boat

Former lifeboats
'ON' is the RNLI's sequential Official Number; 'Op. No.' is the operational number painted onto the boat.

Pulling and sailing lifeboats

Motor lifeboats

Inshore lifeboats

References

External links

 Official station website
 RNLI station information

Lifeboat stations in Devon